Darren Ward may refer to:
 Darren Ward (footballer, born 1974), Welsh international football goalkeeper
 Darren Ward (footballer, born 1978), English football defender
 Darren Ward (swimmer) (born 1968), American-born Canadian swimmer, Olympic competitor